The beach volleyball tournaments at the 2013 Mediterranean Games in Mersin took place between 25 June and 28 June. Both the men's and the women's tournament were held at the Kızkalesi Beach (Maiden's Castle).

Medal table

Medal summary

Events

References

2013
Volleyball at the 2013 Mediterranean Games
2013 in beach volleyball
Sports at the 2013 Mediterranean Games